The Children of Prescott Hall Butler is a marble sculpture by Augustus Saint-Gaudens. It was designed during 1880–1881 and carved during 1906–1907. The sculpture is part of the collection of the Metropolitan Museum of Art.

References

Marble sculptures in New York City
Sculptures by Augustus Saint-Gaudens
Sculptures of children
Sculptures of the Metropolitan Museum of Art